Nurabad (also Romanized as Nūrābād; also known as Noor Abad Kashgoo‘eyeh and Nūrābād-e Kashkū’īyeh) is a village in Koshkuiyeh Rural District, Koshkuiyeh District, Rafsanjan County, Kerman Province, Iran. At the 2006 census, its population was 309, in 68 families.

References 

Populated places in Rafsanjan County